Eivind Eckbo (10 August 1927 – 7 May 2017) was a Norwegian politician, lawyer and farmer.

Biography 
While working as a lawyer in Bø i Telemark, he stood as the second candidate of Anders Lange's Party on the Telemark ballot in the 1973 Norwegian parliamentary election. He was the interim chairman of Anders Lange's Party from the death of party chairman and founder Anders Lange in 1974, until 1975. He was later the deputy chairman and held other offices by the same party after it changed its name into the Progress Party.

Personal life 
He was married to Margaret Eckbo, also a politician for the Progress Party, of which she got introduced to through her husband. She had two children from before they got married, he had 7. Eckbo died on 7 May 2017, aged 89.

References

1927 births
2017 deaths
Progress Party (Norway) politicians
Politicians from Telemark
20th-century Norwegian lawyers